In real analysis, a branch of mathematics, a slowly varying function is a function of a real variable whose behaviour at infinity is in some sense similar to the behaviour of a function converging at infinity. Similarly, a regularly varying function is a function of a real variable whose behaviour at infinity is similar to the behaviour of a power law function (like a polynomial) near infinity. These classes of functions were both introduced by Jovan Karamata, and have found several important applications, for example in probability theory.

Basic definitions 

. A measurable function  is called slowly varying (at infinity) if for all ,

. Let . Then  is a regularly varying function if and only if . In particular, the limit must be finite.

These definitions are due to Jovan Karamata.

Note. In the regularly varying case, the sum of two slowly varying functions is again slowly varying function.

Basic properties 

Regularly varying functions have some important properties: a partial list of them is reported below.

Uniformity of the limiting behaviour
.

Karamata's characterization theorem
. Every regularly varying function  is of the form 
 
where 
 is a real number,
 is a slowly varying function. 
Note. This implies that the function  in  has necessarily to be of the following form 

where the real number  is called the index of regular variation.

Karamata representation theorem
. A function  is slowly varying if and only if there exists  such that for all  the function can be written in the form

where 
 is a bounded measurable function of a real variable converging to a finite number as  goes to infinity
 is a bounded measurable function of a real variable converging to zero as  goes to infinity.

Examples 
 If  is a measurable function and has a limit
 
then  is a slowly varying function.
 For any , the function  is slowly varying.
However, these functions are regularly varying.

See also
Analytic number theory
Hardy–Littlewood tauberian theorem and its treatment by Karamata

Notes

References
 
 
 .

Real analysis
Tauberian theorems
Types of functions